A large number of patents have been filed in the United States since 1978 for video coding systems and devices adhering to the MPEG-2 standard. All of these patents are now expired.

Notes

References

MPEG-2